Caineville is an unincorporated community in central Wayne County, Utah, United States.

Description

The community is located east of Capitol Reef National Park and west of Hanksville, along the Fremont River and Utah State Route 24. The settlement was named after John Thomas Caine and was founded by Elijah Cutler Behunin, whom the LDS Church sent there in 1882 to open the area for settlement.

See also

References

External links

 Travel site article on Caineville
 Pictures of old Caineville houses

Unincorporated communities in Utah
Unincorporated communities in Wayne County, Utah